Mark Stevens (born 25 March 1975) is an English former competitive swimmer, who specialized in sprint and middle-distance freestyle events.

Swimming career
He represented Great Britain in two editions of the Olympic Games, and later earned a total of three medals in freestyle relays at the 1997 FINA Short Course World Championships and at the 1998 Commonwealth Games. During his sporting career, Stevens trained for the City of Cardiff Swim Club in Cardiff, Wales.

Stevens made his Olympic debut at the 1996 Summer Olympics in Atlanta. A member of Team GB, he finished eighth in the 4×100 m freestyle relay (3:21.52), and fifth in the 4×200 m freestyle relay (7:18.74).

At the 1998 Commonwealth Games in Kuala Lumpur, Malaysia, Stevens captured two medals each for the English swimming squad: a silver in the 4×200 m freestyle relay (7:23.83), and a bronze in the 4×100 m freestyle relay (3:22.13).

Stevens competed only in the men's 4×100 m freestyle relay at the 2000 Summer Olympics in Sydney. Teaming with Paul Belk, Anthony Howard, and Jamaican-based Sion Brinn in heat three, Stevens swam the anchor leg and recorded a split of 50.16, but the Brits missed a chance to reach the top 8 final by 0.35 seconds, finishing in third place and ninth overall from the morning prelims with a time of 3:20.45.

He won the 2000 ASA National Championship 100 metres freestyle title.

See also
 List of Commonwealth Games medallists in swimming (men)

References

1975 births
Living people
English male freestyle swimmers
Olympic swimmers of Great Britain
Swimmers at the 1996 Summer Olympics
Swimmers at the 2000 Summer Olympics
Swimmers at the 2002 Commonwealth Games
Commonwealth Games silver medallists for England
Commonwealth Games bronze medallists for England
Sportspeople from Stoke-on-Trent
Medalists at the FINA World Swimming Championships (25 m)
Commonwealth Games medallists in swimming
Medallists at the 1998 Commonwealth Games